Hemang Kamal Badani (born 14 November 1976) is a former Indian Cricketer, who played for the Tamil Nadu and Vidarbha cricket teams. He also captained the Tamil Nadu cricket team.

Early life
Hemang Badani is born in a Gujarati family in Chennai, Tamil Nadu.

Domestic career
In 2007, Badani signed up and played for the Chennai Superstars team in the breakaway Indian Cricket League (ICL). Therefore, he was ruled ineligible for mainstream cricket with Tamil Nadu and India during this time. He quit the ICL in 2009 and made himself available for selection for the Indian Premier League, domestic cricket, and consideration for the Indian national cricket team after a one-year cooling off period.

On 27 January 2010, he along with Tamil Nadu all-rounder C Ganapthy were selected by the Chennai Super Kings for the 2010 Indian Premier League but was not chosen in any of the matches.

He played for Tamil Nadu and Vidarbha in the Ranji Trophy.

International career
Hemang Badani is a polished middle-order batsman and a sleek fielder whose two years in international cricket were characterised by a calm head and inconsistency. At 23, Badani came into an Indian one-day side in the throes of change post match-fixing, and instantly seemed prepared for the void left down the order by the absence of Ajay Jadeja. Upright, and given to scoring in the V, Badani proved adept at remaining not out, and his high point was a wonderfully paced hundred against Australia at Pune in 2001-02. Subsequently, his form became patchy and he was edged out of the squad as other youngsters seized their day. Yet, a grinding hundred in the Ranji final of 2002–03, followed immediately by a good tour of England as vice-captain of the A team, meant he was in with a chance again.

His most famous innings was the One Day International against Australia in the 2000–2001 series at Pune, where he scored a gritty century. Sourav Ganguly, the then captain played Badani consistently for several more tours, mostly as middle-lower order batting all rounder who bowled left arm orthodox spin. He made several appearances before he was dropped from the ODI team in 2004.

Coaching career
Hemang Badani was Head coach for Chepauk Super Gillies team in Tamil Nadu Premier League from 2016. 
 Badani was Consultant for Jaffna Kings team in Lanka Premier League. 

In December 2021, Badani was appointed as fielding coach and scout of the Sunrisers Hyderabad team in Indian Premier League.

References

External links

Twitter profile
2007 Interview
2013 Interview

Indian cricketers
1976 births
Living people
India One Day International cricketers
India Test cricketers
Tamil Nadu cricketers
Chennai Super Kings cricketers
Vidarbha cricketers
Haryana cricketers
Rajasthan cricketers
India Green cricketers
South Zone cricketers
Cricketers from Chennai
Chennai Superstars cricketers